Ectoantennoseius is a genus of mites in the family Ascidae.

Species
 Ectoantennoseius kitchingi Walter, 1998

References

Ascidae